Watson Chapel is a neighborhood in Pine Bluff, Arkansas. It is located at the fork of U.S. Route 79 (Camden Road) and Highway 54 (Sulphur Springs Road), directly southwest of downtown Pine Bluff.

History
Watson Chapel was named after Cumberland Presbyterian minister Benjamin Watson, who settled in nearby Sulphur Springs in the 1870s. Watson later in 1872 founded a church and school which were named Good Faith church and later in 1876 changed to Watson's Chapel Cumberland Presbyterian Church. On April 5, 1880, the school district was formed, with the school still meeting in Rev. Benjamin Watson's church until a separate school building was erected in 1898.

Education
Watson Chapel is served by the Watson Chapel School District, including Watson Chapel High School. The Pine Bluff and Jefferson County Library System operates the Watson Chapel Dave Burdick Library, near the high school and along U.S. Route 79. Its namesake is the library director from 1991 to 2012.

References

External links

 Watson Chapel Library at the Pine Bluff and Jefferson County Library System

19th-century establishments in Arkansas
Watson Chapel
Populated places established in the 19th century